Frazer Dale (born 10 November 1993) is an Australian rules footballer, for the Carlton Football Club in the Australian Football League.

Career
In his junior career, Dale played TAC Cup football for the Calder Cannons, playing initially as a half forward flanker, then later as a defender. Following the 2011 season, Dale was recruited to the AFL as a rookie by the Carlton Football Club with its third round selection in the 2012 Rookie Draft (pick No. 50 overall). He played much of the 2012 season with Carlton's , the Northern Blues, and made his senior debut for Carlton in Round 17.

From a sporting family, Dale is the nephew of Australian test cricketer Adam Dale.

References

External links

Australian rules footballers from Victoria (Australia)
1993 births
Living people
Calder Cannons players
Preston Football Club (VFA) players
Carlton Football Club players